Mohamad Hayan Al Hamwi (born June 9, 1984, in Homs, Syria) is a Syrian footballer. He currently plays for Al-Shabab, which competes in the Bahraini Premier League the top division in Bahrain. He plays as a striker.

Club career
Hamwi started his professional career with Al-Karamah. In August 2008, he transferred to Kuwaiti Premier League club Tadamon, he left the Kuwaiti club after four months. In December 2008, he returned to Al-Karamah.

International career
Hamwi was a part of the Syrian U-19 national team that finished in Fourth place at the AFC U-19 Championship 2004 in Malaysia and he was a part of the Syrian U-20 national team at the FIFA U-20 World Cup 2005 in the Netherlands. He plays against Italy and Colombia in the group-stage of the FIFA U-20 World Cup and against Brazil in the Round of 16. He scored one goal against Italy in the second match of the group-stage.

Honours and titles

Club
Al-Karamah
Syrian Premier League (4 titles): 2006, 2007, 2008, 2009 
Syrian Cup (4 titles): 2007, 2008, 2009, 2010
Syrian Super Cup (1 title): 2008
AFC Champions League: 2006 Runner-up
AFC Cup: 2009 Runner-up

National team
AFC U-19 Championship 2004: Fourth place
FIFA U-20 World Cup 2005: Round of 16

Individual
 Syrian Footballer of the Year: 2009
 AFC Abdullah Al Dabal Most Valuable Player Award: 2009
 2009 AFC Cup top scorer.

References

External links

1984 births
Living people
Sportspeople from Homs
Syrian footballers
Association football forwards
Syria international footballers
Al-Karamah players
Al-Hazem F.C. players
Al Hala SC players
Syrian expatriate footballers
Expatriate footballers in Bahrain
Expatriate footballers in Kuwait
Expatriate footballers in Jordan
Expatriate footballers in Iraq
Syrian expatriate sportspeople in Bahrain
Syrian expatriate sportspeople in Kuwait
Syrian expatriate sportspeople in Jordan
Syrian expatriate sportspeople in Iraq
Saudi First Division League players
Syrian expatriate sportspeople in Saudi Arabia
Al-Faisaly SC players
Footballers at the 2006 Asian Games
Asian Games competitors for Syria
Syrian Premier League players
Kuwait Premier League players
Al Tadhamon SC players
Shabab Al-Ordon Club players
Zakho FC players